Diffractella is a genus of fungi within the Lasiosphaeriaceae family. This is a monotypic genus, containing the single species Diffractella curvata.

References

External links
Diffractella at Index Fungorum

Lasiosphaeriaceae
Monotypic Sordariomycetes genera